The 1997 Philippine Basketball Association (PBA) All-Filipino Cup was the first conference of the 1997 PBA season. It started on February 16 and ended on May 25, 1997. The tournament is an All-Filipino format, which doesn't require an import or a pure-foreign player for each team.

Format
The following format will be observed for the duration of the conference:
 Double-round robin eliminations; 14 games per team; Teams are then seeded by basis on win–loss records.
 The top five teams after the eliminations will advance to the semifinals.
 Semifinals will be two round robin affairs with the remaining five teams. Results from the eliminations will be carried over. A playoff incentive for a finals berth will be given to the team that will win at least five of their eight semifinal games.
 The top two teams (or the top team and the winner of the playoff incentive) will face each other in a best-of-seven championship series. The next two teams (or the loser of the playoff incentive and the fourth seeded team) dispute the third-place trophy in a one-game playoff.

Elimination round

Team standings

Semifinals

Team standings

Cumulative standings

Semifinal round standings:

Third place playoff

Finals

References

External links
 PBA.ph

All-Filipino Cup
PBA Philippine Cup